Raffensperger is a German-language surname. Notable people with this surname include:

 Brad Raffensperger (born 1955), American politician who has served as Secretary of State of Georgia since 2019.
 Carolyn Raffensperger, American environmental lawyer
 Leonard Raffensperger (1903–1974), American football and basketball player and coach

See also 

 Ravensberg (disambiguation)
 Ravensbrück
 Ravensburger

Surnames
German-language surnames